Emancipado was a term used for an African-descended social-political demographic within the population of Spanish Guinea (modern day Equatorial Guinea) that existed in the early to mid 1900s. This segment of the native population had become assimilated into the former White society of Spanish Guinea which primarily existed along the coastline communities of the continental part of the country, as well as on the islands of Bioko and Annobón.

Population specifics 
This population included:

 Full-blooded descendants of local/regional native tribes that had assimilated to the Whites after receiving a Christian Spanish education.
 Descendants of freed Cuban slaves who, despite being free to return to Cuba, remained in the country, marrying into the local population. These former slaves were brought to Africa by the Royal Orders of September 13, 1845 (by way of voluntary arrangement) and a June 20, 1861 deportation from Cuba, due to the lack of volunteers. Many were of European and/or Amerindian ancestry.
 Mulattoes born to Equatorial Guinean mothers and white Spanish fathers, some unacknowledged by their fathers. Offspring resulting from unions of consent between African women and European men had become a social trend around the mid 1900s in Equatorial Guinea, as well as other parts of West Africa.

Society 
Emancipados were socially and culturally mixed. Many were part of the native tribal landscape, and most others contributed to the once-thriving intellectual community that resulted from having access to Christian and European education. Their education helped propel Spanish Guinea as having the highest literacy rate of all African countries in the mid-1900s. The once-thriving community also contributed to the wealth of Spanish Guinea, which was once the third wealthiest African country before its independence from Spain.

Exodus 
Due to political dissension surrounding the Equatorial Guinean independence from Spain in 1968, many Emancipados relocated to Europe after being met with anti-European sentiments and counter political pressures from the incoming regime. Subsequently, this led to the slaughter of some within this population.

Many Emancipados relocated to Spain (the Canary Islands), São Tomé and Príncipe, and Cape Verde. In present day Equatorial Guinea, a few descendants of Emancipados returned to live in Equatorial Guinea.

See also 
 Affranchis
Saros
 Assimilados
 Bubi
 Edward Thaddeus Barleycorn Barber
 Évolués
 Fernandinos
 Ilustrados
 Ladino people
 Spanish Guinea
 Black Ladino
 Principalía
 Gente de razón

References

Former peoples of the African diaspora
History of Equatorial Guinea
Spanish Africa

Black_elite